Roso may refer to:

 Ángelo Roso Neto (born 1960), Brazilian rower
 Đovani Roso (born 1972), Croatian football player
 Mario Roso de Luna (1872–1931), Spanish lawyer, theosophist, journalist, writer, freemason and astrologist
 Rosō Fukuhara (1892–1946), Japanese photographer
 Zvonimir Roso (1938–1997), Croatian criminologist and psychologist

See also
 Rosso (surname)

Croatian surnames